Settipeta is a small village in Andhra Pradesh state of India. It comes under Nidadavole mandal, East Godavari district. It is located in between Tanuku and Nidadavole.
People speak Telugu language here.
 The nearest railway stations are Kaldhari and Nidadavole.
 Nearest Airport is Rajahmundry airport.
Velivennu is the neighbor village to Settipeta.
The nearest town to it is Nidadavole.

Demographics 

 Census of India, Settipeta has population of 4,360 of which 2,187 are males while 2,173 are females.  Average Sex Ratio of Velivennu village is 994. Population of children with age 0-6 is 438 which makes up 10.05% of total population of village. Literacy rate of Velivennu village was 75.52%.

References

Villages in East Godavari district